William Williams VC, DSM & Bar (5 October 1890 – 22 October 1965), was a Welsh recipient of the Victoria Cross, the highest and most prestigious award for gallantry in the face of the enemy that can be awarded to a member of the British and Commonwealth armed forces.

He was from Amlwch on Anglesey and at age 26 was serving as a seaman in the Royal Naval Reserve during the First World War when the following deed took place:

 On 7 June 1917, HMS Pargust (a Q ship) was out in the Atlantic Ocean when her engine room was damaged by a torpedo fired from the U-boat . The explosion loosened the gun covers and Seaman Williams, with great presence of mind, took the whole weight on himself and physically prevented the covers from falling and betraying the ship to the enemy.

The Pargust's 'panic party', the decoy crew carried on every Q ship for the purpose of leaving it apparently abandoned when attacked, took to the lifeboats and the U-boat then surfaced, believing the Pargust to be a crewless and defenceless merchant vessel.

In the case of a gallant and daring act in which all men are deemed equally brave and deserving of the Victoria Cross a secret ballot is drawn. The crew of  HMS Pargust selected William Williams to be the recipient of the award due to a rating in the action.

Honours and awards
23 March 1917 - Distinguished Service Medal - 
20 July 1917 - Victoria Cross -

Photographs

See also
Ronald Niel Stuart

References

Monuments to Courage (David Harvey, 1999)
The Register of the Victoria Cross (This England, 1997)
VCs of the First World War - The Naval VCs (Stephen Snelling, 2002)

External links

1890 births
1965 deaths
People from Amlwch
Royal Navy sailors
British World War I recipients of the Victoria Cross
Recipients of the Distinguished Service Medal (United Kingdom)
Royal Navy personnel of World War I
Royal Navy recipients of the Victoria Cross
Welsh recipients of the Victoria Cross
Royal Naval Reserve personnel
Welsh military personnel
Burials in Wales